Nadaf is a surname. Notable people with the surname include:

 Farmud Nadaf, Nepalese politician
 Hamidreza Nadaf (born 1992), Iranian tennis played
Kaseem Nadaf, Nepalese politician

See also
 
 Naddaf